Andrés Rendón (born 3 April 1980) is a Colombian karateka. He was four times Panamerican champion, who won the gold medal in the 60 kg weight class at the 2011 Pan American Games. He also won a silver medal at the 2010 Central American and Caribbean Games, a gold medal at the 2010 South American Games, a gold medal at the World Games 2013, and a gold medal at the 2018 Central American and Caribbean Games.

References
 

1980 births
Living people
Colombian male karateka
Pan American Games gold medalists for Colombia
Pan American Games bronze medalists for Colombia
Karateka at the 2011 Pan American Games
Karateka at the 2015 Pan American Games
World Games gold medalists
Pan American Games medalists in karate
Competitors at the 2013 World Games
Central American and Caribbean Games gold medalists for Colombia
Central American and Caribbean Games silver medalists for Colombia
Competitors at the 2006 Central American and Caribbean Games
Competitors at the 2010 Central American and Caribbean Games
South American Games gold medalists for Colombia
South American Games bronze medalists for Colombia
South American Games medalists in karate
Competitors at the 2010 South American Games
Central American and Caribbean Games medalists in karate
World Games medalists in karate
Medalists at the 2011 Pan American Games
Medalists at the 2015 Pan American Games
20th-century Colombian people
21st-century Colombian people